Bhavantar Bhugtan Yojana  (price difference payment scheme) is a scheme of the Government of Madhya Pradesh whereby the government pays farmers the difference between official Minimum Support Price (MSP) and the rate at which they sell their crops or Model Price whichever is higher.

The objective of the scheme is to provide the compensation to farmers for agriculture products whenever its price fall below the announced Minimum support price (MSP) and thereby protecting them from losses suffered on account of distress sale.

The scheme was launched by the chief minister Shivraj Singh on 16 October 2017. The state government in first year introduced the scheme for eight crops mainly in the oilseeds and pulses category. Later in 2018 the scheme was extended to total 13 Kharif crops.

References

Agriculture in Madhya Pradesh
Government schemes in Madhya Pradesh
Agricultural marketing in India
Agricultural finance in India
Agricultural subsidies
Chief Ministership of Shivraj Singh Chouhan